is a town located in Koyu District, Miyazaki Prefecture, Japan.

As of October 1, 2019, the town had an estimated population of 5,008 and the density of 34.3 persons per km². The total area is 145.96 km².

References

External links

Kijō official website 

Towns in Miyazaki Prefecture